Vlagtwedde is a village in the very southeast of Groningen province in the northeastern Netherlands. It lies on the Dutch border with the German state of Lower Saxony to the east.

History 
The municipality of Vlagtwedde was created in December 1811.

On 1 January 2018, the municipality of Vlagtwedde was merged with Bellingwedde to form the new municipality of Westerwolde.

Geography 
The population centres in the municipality of Vlagtwedde were:

Abeltjeshuis, Bakovensmee, Barnflair, Borgertange, Borgerveld, Bourtange, Burgemeester Beinsdorp, De Bruil, Ellersinghuizen, Hanetange, Harpel, Hasseberg, Hebrecht, 't Heem, Jipsingboermussel, Jipsingboertange, Jipsinghuizen, Lammerweg, Laude, Lauderbeetse, Laudermarke, Lauderzwarteveen, Leemdobben, Maten, Munnekemoer, Over de Dijk, Overdiep, Pallert, Plaggenborg, Poldert, Renneborg, Rhederveld, Rijsdam, Roelage, 't Schot, Sellingen, Sellingerbeetse, Sellingerzwarteveen, Slegge, Stakenborg, Stobben, Ter Apel, Ter Apelkanaal, Ter Borg, Ter Haar, Ter Walslage, Ter Wisch, Veele, Veerste Veldhuis, Vlagtwedde, Vlagtwedder-Barlage, Vlagtwedder-Veldhuis, Weende, Weenderveld, Weite, Wessingtange, Wollingboermarke, Wollinghuizen, Zandberg and Zuidveld.

Because of the large number of official centres, the municipality had five postal codes:
 9541 Vlagtwedde
 9545 Bourtange
 9551 Sellingen
 9561 Ter Apel
 9563 Ter Apelkanaal

All 60 villages and hamlets in the municipality received their own town sign in 2008.

Politics
The city council of Vlagtwedde had 17 seats. The table below gives political party and seat counts since 1998.

Public transport
Vlagtwedde is served by several bus lines:
 line 14: Stadskanaal-Alteveer-Vlagtwedde-Veele-Blijham-Winschoten
 line 42: Emmen-Emmer Compascuum-Ter Apel-Sellingen-Vlagtwedde
 line 72: Vlagtwedde-Bourtange
 line 73: Emmen-Nieuw Weerdinge-Ter Apel-Ter Apelkanaal-Zandberg-Musselkanaal-Stadskanaal-Hoogezand-Groningen
 buurtbus (community volunteer-driven bus) 92: Stadskanaal-Mussel-Jipsingbourtange-Jipsinghuizen-Sellingen

International relations
Vlagtwedde is twinned with:

 Międzyrzecz, Poland

References

External links

Westerwolde (municipality)
Former municipalities of Groningen (province)
Populated places in Groningen (province)
Municipalities of the Netherlands disestablished in 2018